Shayni Nelson (née Buswell, born 1 February 1981) is a former field hockey player from Australia, who played as a midfielder.

Career

Club hockey
In Hockey WA's Premier League competition, Nelson plays for the University of Western Australia. In 2019, Nelson reached a career milestone and club record of 350 Premier League games.

AHL
Nelson made her debut in the Australian Hockey League (AHL) in 2001 as a member of the WAIS Diamonds. Nelson went on to represent the team until 2011, winning 5 national titles throughout her career.

International hockey

Under–21
In 2000, Nelson made her debut for the Australia U–21 side at the Junior Oceania Cup in Canberra.

She went on to represent the team again in 2001 at the FIH Junior World Cup in Buenos Aires, where she won a bronze medal.

Hockeyroos
Nelson made her senior international debut for the Hockeyroos in 2002, during the FIH Champions Trophy in Macau.

References

External links

Hockey Australia

1981 births
Living people
Australian female field hockey players
Female field hockey midfielders